Melba Escobar de Nogales (born 1976 Cali, Colombia) is a Colombian writer and journalist.

Life
She graduated from Universidad de los Andes.
She writes for El Espectador of Bogotá and El País of Cali.

Works

Bogotá Sueña. La Ciudad Por Los Niños, Editorial Codice, 2007
Duermevela, Editorial Planeta, 2010
Johnny y el mar, Tragaluz Editores, 2014
La Casa de la Belleza, Emecé Editores. 2015
House of Beauty translated by Elizabeth Bryer, Harper Collins,
La Mujer que Hablaba Sola, Editorial Seix Barral. 2019

References

External links
 Melba Escobar
 The Sordid Twists of Beauty

Living people
1976 births
Colombian women journalists
21st-century Colombian women writers
21st-century Colombian writers
People from Cali